Wako Wako is a Philippine fantasy drama series in the Philippines. The series premiered on ABS-CBN and worldwide on The Filipino Channel from March 5, 2012 to May 25, 2012 replacing Maria la del Barrio and was replaced by Hiyas on its network Primetime Bida block. On May 7, 2012 the series was moved to Kapamilya Gold to give way for Aryana.

Overview

Synopsis
Wako Wako is a story of seven-year-old boy Muymuy (Yogo Singh), who yearns to make his father, a respected policeman, proud. His cowardly nature, however, prevents him from doing so. He will discover a magical creature and he'll call it Wako. Wako-Wako fulfills all his wishes, but soon Muymuy discovers that every granted wish comes with a price.

A mysterious lady named Dyosa Marishka (Ai-Ai de las Alas) finds Muymuy and tells him that Wako is an Arukan and that she is a goddess of wishes in need of help from the creature. The goddess needs to find seven people who will provide pure selfless wishes to save her kingdom and bring her back to power. In return, Wako helps Muymuy with his family's problems in this endearing tale of friendship and relations.

Cast and characters

Main cast
 Marian "Gandang Girl" Barro as Wako-Wako
 Ai-Ai de las Alas as Dyosa Marishka
 Yogo Singh as Rodel "Muymuy" Gaudencio Jr.
 Gladys Reyes as Isay Gaudencio

Supporting cast
 Vandolph Quizon as Rodel Gaudencio
 Maricar de Mesa as Lilibeth
 Malou de Guzman as Teresing "Ima" Gaudencio
 Dennis Padilla as Tanyo
 DJ Durano as Dado Calleja
 Karen Dematera as Verma
 Carlos Agassi as Tummy Nograles
 Markki Stroem as Kyle
 Liezel Garcia as Nora Santos
 Tess Antonio as Vilma
 Eagle Riggs as Turing
 Franco Daza as Draco Calleja
 Joy Viado† as Senyang
 Abby Bautista as Mica
 Ruther Urquia as Arukans (voice)
 Lou Veloso as Chief Satano

Guest cast
 Simon Ibarra as Lando Martinez
 Kenji Shirakawa as Mark Rodriguez
 Kyle Ang as Jonas Calleja
 Amy Nobleza as Young Ima
 Rustica Carpio
 Neri Naig as Carmen
 Ina Feleo as Teresa Calleja
 Ricky Rivero as Obet
 Michael Agassi as Gaston
 Jelo Echaluce as Jumbo
 Cecil Paz as Miss U
 Rita Rosario G. Carlos as Urduja
 Jommy Teotico as Police Asset
 Ronnie Golpeo as RonnieL
 Minco Fabregas as Mayor
 Miguelito de Guzman as Rusty
 Manuel Chua as Mr. Lee

List of Arukans
Dyosa Marishka - Goddess of arukanan
Barkan/Wako Wako - Best friend of Muymuy
Muymuy - People body but heart of arukan, he is the last arukan
Tanderkan - Anchorite of arukanan
Ponkan
Louverkan
Trashkan
Linggitkan
Genghiskan
Luciokan
Odettekan
Dezcanca/Ukaw Ukaw - The bad arukan

Production

Starting May 7, 2012, when the series moved to Kapamilya Gold Timeslot, Wako Wako is not available in all ABS-CBN Regional Network Group channels due to local versions of TV Patrol on the same time slot. Instead a replay of recent broadcasts are shown the next day mostly Mondays-Fridays on its Morning block.

See also
List of programs broadcast by ABS-CBN Corporation
List of dramas of ABS-CBN Corporation

References

External links
 
 
 Wako Wako Fansite

2012 Philippine television series debuts
2012 Philippine television series endings
ABS-CBN drama series
Fantaserye and telefantasya
2010s children's television series
Filipino-language television shows
Television shows set in the Philippines